This is a list of cinemas that exist or have existed in the city of Toronto, Ontario, Canada.

See also

List of Ottawa-Gatineau cinemas
List of IMAX venues

References

External links
Cinema Treasures

 Ontario
Cinemas in Toronto
Toronto